"Uzura: 13 Japanese Birds Pt. 5", a song by Masami Akita
 Uzura, a Hayabusa-class torpedo boat
 Uzura-gakure, a Ninja technique
 Uzura, a character in the anime Princess Tutu